Carboxylesterase 2 is an enzyme that in humans is encoded by the CES2 gene.  It is a member of the alpha/beta fold hydrolase family.

Carboxylesterase 2 is a member of a large multigene family. The enzymes encoded by these genes are responsible for the hydrolysis of ester- and amide-bond-containing drugs such as cocaine and heroin. They also hydrolyze long-chain fatty acid esters and thioesters. The specific function of this enzyme has not yet been determined; however, it is speculated that carboxylesterases may play a role in lipid metabolism and/or the blood–brain barrier system. Two alternatively spliced transcript variants encoding distinct isoforms have been found for this gene.

Interactive pathway map

References

Further reading